Estadio Nuevo Monumental is a stadium in Rafaela, Argentina.  It is the home ground of Atlético de Rafaela.  The stadium was opened in 1954, and has a capacity of 16,000.

References

Atlético de Rafaela
Sports venues in Argentina
Rafaela
1954 establishments in Argentina